Time to Turn is the tenth studio album by German rock band Eloy, released in 1982. On the UK release the track 'Magic Mirrors' was replaced by 'Illuminations', originally released on the 1980 album Colours. The UK issue, on the Heavy Metal World-wide label, featured different artwork by noted fantasy illustrator Rodney Matthews.

It is the first album since Power and the Passion to feature drummer Fritz Randow.

Track listing
All music composed and arranged by Eloy. Story by Frank Bornemann. Lyrics by Sigi Hausen.

Personnel
 Frank Bornemann — guitar, vocals
 Hannes Arkona — guitar, percussion, keyboards
 Hannes Folberth — keyboards
 Klaus-Peter Matziol — bass
 Fritz Randow — drums
 Sabine, Amy, and Anne — additional vocals on "Time To Turn"

References

External links
 
 

1982 albums
Eloy (band) albums
Albums with cover art by Rodney Matthews